Mahadevapura is a village in Mandya district of Karnataka province in India. The village and its surrounding places are known for film shooting.

Transportation
The road from Mysore to Mahadevapura starts from Sathgully bus station in East Mysore.  It goes through Ramanahalli village before reaching Mahadevapura bridge. The river Kaveri has a bund here.

Image gallery

References

Villages in Mandya district